is a station in Hamada, Shimane Prefecture, Japan.

Lines
 West Japan Railway Company (JR West)
 San'in Main Line

Layout
The station has an island platform and two tracks.

Adjacent stations
West Japan Railway Company (JR West)

Railway stations in Japan opened in 1926
Railway stations in Shimane Prefecture
Sanin Main Line